Rahul Dayakiran is an Indian film actor known for his works in Telugu cinema. He made his film debut with Sekhar Kammula's 2007 film, Happy Days.

Career
Haridas made his debut with Happy Days in 2007, appearing as one of the leads along with Varun Sandesh, Sonia Deepti and Gayatri Rao. In 2008, he appeared in Rainbow, directed by VN Aditya. From 2014 to 2017 he took a break and In 2017, he made his comeback in the real story based crime-thriller, Venkatapuram starring Mahima Makwana.

Filmography

References

1986 births
Living people